Pioneer Quest: A Year in the Real West was a Canadian documentary television series which aired on History Television and the Public Broadcasting Service in 2001. It is the first entry of producer Jamie Brown's "Quest series" which includes Quest for the Bay (2002), Klondike: The Quest for Gold (2003) and Quest for the Sea (2004).  It was filmed on a site just north of Argyle, Manitoba

Cast
Alana Logie
Frank Logie
Deanna Treadway
Tim Treadway

Episodes

References

External links

2000s Canadian documentary television series
Historical reality television series
History (Canadian TV network) original programming
2000 Canadian television series debuts
2001 Canadian television series endings